Adolphe Mengotti (born 12 November 1901, in Valladolid, Spain - 1984) was a Swiss football (soccer) player who competed in the 1924 Summer Olympics. He played for Servette FC and Real Madrid. He was a member of the Swiss Olympic team, which won the silver medal in the football tournament.

References

External links

1901 births
1984 deaths
Footballers from Valladolid
Swiss men's footballers
Footballers at the 1924 Summer Olympics
Olympic footballers of Switzerland
Olympic silver medalists for Switzerland
Switzerland international footballers
Olympic medalists in football
Medalists at the 1924 Summer Olympics
Real Madrid CF players
Association football midfielders